407th may refer to:

407th Air Expeditionary Group, provisional United States Air Force unit assigned to the United States Air Forces Central 321st Air Expeditionary Wing
407th Air Refueling Squadron, inactive United States Air Force unit
407th Brigade Support Battalion, support battalion of the United States Army
407th Military Hospital (Ukraine), military hospital of the Ukrainian Armed Forces in Chernihiv
407th Support Brigade (United States), support brigade of the United States Army

See also
407 (number)
407, the year 407 (CDVII) of the Julian calendar
407 BC